The 1979–80 Tampa Bay Rowdies indoor season was the sixth indoor season of the club's existence.

Overview
The 1979–80 indoor season was the Tampa Bay Rowdies' sixth season of existence, and their sixth season of indoor play. As in previous years, all home games were played at the Bayfront Center in St. Petersburg, Florida. It was the first fully sanctioned indoor season in the North American Soccer League’s history and Tampa Bay lost only once at home. The Rowdies finished second in the Eastern Division, and qualified for the playoffs with an 8–4 record. They won five of six matches in the playoffs en route to winning the Eastern Division crown, the NASL indoor championship, and a 13–5 overall finish. Yugoslavian, Petar Baralić led the club with 21 goals in the regular season, and 23 across all competitions.

Playoffs
The Rowdies completely dismantled Detroit in the first round with a 12–1 victory. In the Eastern Division championship series they swept top-seeded Atlanta, 7–3 and 6–5. In the Championship finals Memphis took the first game, by a count of 5–4. Tampa Bay stormed back on the return leg, 10–4, to set up a tiebreaker. Peter Anderson scored the only goal of the deciding mini-game to give the NASL indoor title to the Rowdies. South African, Steve Wegerle led the team in the postseason with 11 goals. While presenting the championship trophy to Rowdies captain Jan van der Veen, NASL commissioner Phil Woosnam said, “It was only fitting, because Tampa Bay was instrumental in the development of indoor soccer.”

Club

Roster 
*trialist player

Management and technical staff 
 George W. Strawbridge, Jr., owner
 Chas Serednesky, Jr., general manager 
 Gordon Jago , head coach 
 Keith Peacock, assistant coach
 Ken Shields, trainer
 Alfredo Beronda, equipment manager

Honors 
 NASL Indoor Champions: 1979–80
 NASL Eastern Division Indoor Champions: 1979–80

Regular season

Final standings
W = Wins, L = Losses, GB = Games Behind 1st Place, % = Winning Percentage, GF = Goals For, GA = Goals Against, Avg Att = Average Home Attendance

Results

Playoffs

Bracket

Results

Statistics

Season scoring
GP = Games Played, G = Goals (worth 2 points), A = Assists (worth 1 point), Pts = Points, Pen = Penalty Minutes

Season goalkeeping
Note: GP = Games played; Min = Minutes played; GA = Goals against; GAA = Goals against average; W = Wins; L = Losses

Playoff scoring
GP = Games Played, G = Goals (worth 2 points), A = Assists (worth 1 point), Pts = Points

See also
 1979–80 NASL Indoor season
 1980 in American soccer
 Tampa Bay Rowdies (1975–1993)

References

External links
 1979–80 Rowdies stats
 1980 in American Soccer

Tampa Bay Rowdies
1979-80 indoor
Tampa Bay Rowdies (1975–1993) seasons
Tampa Bay Rowdies
Tampa Bay Rowdies
Tampa
Sports in St. Petersburg, Florida